Severance Lake is a lake in Sibley County, in the U.S. state of Minnesota.

Severance Lake was named for Martin Juan Severance, a state legislator.

References

Lakes of Minnesota
Lakes of Sibley County, Minnesota